In mathematics, the Littelmann path model is a combinatorial device due to Peter Littelmann for computing multiplicities without overcounting in the representation theory of symmetrisable Kac–Moody algebras. Its most important application is to complex semisimple Lie algebras or equivalently compact semisimple Lie groups, the case described in this article. Multiplicities in irreducible representations, tensor products and branching rules can be calculated using a coloured directed graph, with labels given by the simple roots of the Lie algebra.

Developed as a bridge between the theory of crystal bases arising from the work of Kashiwara and Lusztig on quantum groups and the standard monomial theory of C. S. Seshadri and Lakshmibai, Littelmann's path model associates to each irreducible representation a rational vector space with basis given by paths from the origin to a weight as well as a pair of root operators acting on paths for each simple root. This gives a direct way of recovering the algebraic and combinatorial structures previously discovered by Kashiwara and Lusztig using quantum groups.

Background and motivation
Some of the basic questions in the representation theory of complex semisimple Lie algebras or compact semisimple Lie groups going back to Hermann Weyl include:

 For a given dominant weight λ, find the weight multiplicities in the irreducible representation L(λ) with highest weight λ.
 For two highest weights λ, μ, find the decomposition of their tensor product L(λ)  L(μ) into irreducible representations.
 Suppose that  is the Levi component of a parabolic subalgebra of a semisimple Lie algebra .

(Note that the first problem, of weight multiplicities, is the special case of the third in which the parabolic subalgebra is a Borel subalgebra. Moreover, the Levi branching problem can be embedded in the tensor product problem as a certain limiting case.)

Answers to these questions were first provided by Hermann Weyl and Richard Brauer as consequences of explicit character formulas, followed by later combinatorial formulas of Hans Freudenthal, Robert Steinberg and Bertram Kostant; see . An unsatisfactory feature of these formulas is that they involved alternating sums for quantities that were known a priori to be non-negative. Littelmann's method expresses these multiplicities as sums of non-negative integers without overcounting. His work generalizes classical results based on Young tableaux for the general linear Lie algebra n or the special linear Lie algebra n:

 Issai Schur's result in his 1901 dissertation that the weight multiplicities could be counted in terms of column-strict Young tableaux (i.e. weakly increasing to the right along rows, and strictly increasing down columns).
 The celebrated Littlewood–Richardson rule that describes both tensor product decompositions and branching from  m+n to  m   n in terms of lattice permutations of skew tableaux.

Attempts at finding similar algorithms without overcounting for the other classical Lie algebras had only been partially successful.

Littelmann's contribution was to give a unified combinatorial model that applied to all symmetrizable Kac–Moody algebras and provided explicit subtraction-free combinatorial formulas for weight multiplicities, tensor product rules and branching rules.
The combinatorial data could be encoded in a coloured directed graph, with labels given by the simple roots.

Littelmann's main motivation was to reconcile two different aspects of representation theory:

 The standard monomial theory of Lakshmibai and Seshadri arising from the geometry of Schubert varieties.
Crystal bases arising in the approach to quantum groups of  Masaki Kashiwara and George Lusztig. Kashiwara and Lusztig constructed canonical bases for representations of deformations of the universal enveloping algebra of  depending on a formal deformation parameter q. In the degenerate case when q = 0, these yield crystal bases together with pairs of operators corresponding to simple roots; see .

Although differently defined, the crystal basis, its root operators and crystal graph were later shown to be equivalent to Littelmann's path model and graph; see . In the case of complex semisimple Lie algebras, there is a simplified self-contained account in  relying only on the properties of root systems; this approach is followed here.

Definitions
Let P be the weight lattice in the dual of a Cartan subalgebra of the semisimple Lie algebra .

A Littelmann path is a piecewise-linear mapping

such that π(0) = 0 and π(1) is a weight.

Let (H α) be the basis of   consisting of "coroot" vectors, dual to basis of * formed by simple roots (α). For fixed α and a path  π, the function  has a minimum value M.

Define non-decreasing self-mappings l and r of [0,1]  Q by

Thus l(t) = 0 until the last time that h(s) = M and r(t) = 1 after the first time that h(s) = M.

Define new paths πl and  πr by

The root operators eα and fα are defined on a basis vector [π] by

  if r (0) = 0 and 0 otherwise;
  if l (1) = 1 and 0 otherwise.

The key feature here is that the paths form a basis for the root operators like that of a monomial representation: when a root operator is applied to the basis element for a path, the result is either 0 or the basis element for another path.

Properties
Let  be the algebra generated by the root operators. Let π(t) be a path lying wholly within the positive Weyl chamber defined by the simple roots. Using results on the path model of C. S. Seshadri and Lakshmibai, Littelmann showed that

the -module generated by [π] depends only on π(1) = λ and has a Q-basis consisting of paths [σ];
the multiplicity of the weight μ in the integrable highest weight representation L(λ) is the number of paths σ with σ(1) = μ.

There is also an action of the Weyl group on paths [π]. If α is a simple root and k = h(1), with h as above, then the corresponding reflection sα acts as follows:

 sα [π] = [π] if k = 0;
 sα [π]= fαk [π] if k > 0;
 sα [π]= eα – k [π] if k < 0.

If π is a path lying wholly inside the positive Weyl chamber, the Littelmann graph  is defined to be the coloured, directed graph having as vertices the non-zero paths obtained by successively applying the operators fα to π. There is a directed arrow from one path to another labelled by the simple root α, if the target path is obtained from the source path by applying fα.

 The Littelmann graphs of two paths are isomorphic as coloured, directed graphs if and only if the paths have the same end point.

The Littelmann graph therefore only depends on λ.  Kashiwara and Joseph proved that it coincides with the "crystal graph" defined by Kashiwara in the theory of crystal bases.

Applications

Character formula

If π(1) = λ, the multiplicity of the weight μ in L(λ) is the number of  vertices σ in the Littelmann graph  with σ(1) = μ.

Generalized Littlewood–Richardson rule

Let π and σ be paths in the positive Weyl chamber with π(1) = λ and σ(1) = μ. Then

where τ ranges over paths in  such that π  τ lies entirely in the positive Weyl chamber and
the concatenation π  τ (t) is defined as π(2t) for t ≤ 1/2 and π(1) + τ( 2t – 1) for t ≥ 1/2.

Branching rule

See also

 Crystal basis

Notes

References

 

 [instructional course]

Representation theory
Lie algebras
Algebraic combinatorics